The RV Polar Duke is a 219-foot ice-strengthened research vessel built in 1983. Polar Duke was designed specifically for scientific research with wet and dry laboratories, and an electronic workshop and laboratory. The hull is constructed similar to that of an icebreaker, but the ship isn’t as powerful as an icebreaker. It was originally equipped with a stern A-frame crane and helicopter deck; these were both removed in a major refit in 1998.

Polar Duke was chartered by the National Science Foundation for use in support of the United States Antarctic Program (USAP) from January 1985 until June 1997. The "Duke" transported supplies and personnel between Palmer Station, Antarctica and the port of Punta Arenas, Chile, on the Strait of Magellan, for 13 years, providing seagoing and shore-based research support in waters and islands in the Drake Passage and around the Antarctic Peninsula. In November 1997 Polar Duke was replaced in its role with USAP by the ice strengthened Lawrence M. Gould.

In May 1998, the Polar Duke was rebuilt by its Norwegian owner, Rieber Shipping, as a seismic survey vessel, extending the aft superstructure and converting the helideck to a regular deck. It was assigned to a Rieber subsidiary, Exploration Vessel Resources, which was spun off in 2005 and acquired later that year by CGG, which is now part of CGGVeritas. It was renamed CGG Duke in 2006, and Duke in 2008. The vessel was decommissioned by CGGV in 2009, was reflagged to the Bahamas, and is currently  operated by Gardline CGGV, a joint venture between Gardline Geosurvey and CGGVeritas.

References

External links

 A farewell tribute to RV Polar Duke - contains anecdotes and lists of crew
 RV Polar Duke specifications in 1996

Research vessels of the United States
Ships built in Norway
1983 ships